Satellite navigation solution for the receiver's position (geopositioning) involves an algorithm. In essence, a GNSS receiver measures the transmitting time of GNSS signals emitted from four or more GNSS satellites (giving the pseudorange) and these measurements are used to obtain its position (i.e., spatial coordinates) and reception time.

Calculation steps
 A global-navigation-satellite-system (GNSS) receiver measures the apparent transmitting time, or "phase", of GNSS signals emitted from four or more GNSS satellites, simultaneously.
 GNSS satellites broadcast the messages of satellites' ephemeris, and intrinsic clock bias (i.e., clock advance),  as the functions of (atomic) standard time, e.g., GPST.
 The Gauss–Newton method can be used to solve the nonlinear least-squares problem for the solution: , where .

Their inference is formalized as maximum a posteriori estimation.

The solution illustrated

The GPS case 
 For Global Positioning System (GPS), the non-closed-form equations in step 3 result in

Two times of iteration will be necessary and sufficient in most cases. Its iterative update will be described by using the approximated inverse of Jacobian matrix as follows:

 Tropospheric delay should not be ignored, while the Global Positioning System (GPS) specification doesn't provide its detailed description.

The GLONASS case 
 The GLONASS ephemerides don't provide clock biases , but .

See also
Time to first fix

Notes
 In the field of GNSS,  is called pseudorange, where  is a provisional reception time of the receiver.  is called receiver's clock bias (i.e., clock advance).
 The temporal variation in the relativistic clock bias of satellite is linear if its orbit is circular (and thus its velocity is uniform in inertial frame).
 The nonlinearity of the vertical dependency of tropospheric delay degrades the convergence efficiency in the Gauss–Newton iterations in step 7.
 The above notation is different from that in the Wikipedia articles, 'Position calculation introduction' and 'Position calculation advanced', of Global Positioning System (GPS).

See also
 Dilution of precision (navigation)
 Global Positioning System#Navigation equations
 Least squares adjustment
 Precise Point Positioning
 Real Time Kinematic

References

External links
 PVT (Position, Velocity, Time): Calculation procedure in the open-source GNSS-SDR and the underlying RTKLIB

Satellite navigation